Gomer Lloyd (26 February 1947 – 3 January 2016) was a British bobsledder. He competed at the 1972, 1976, 1980, and the 1984 Winter Olympics.

References

1947 births
2016 deaths
British male bobsledders
Olympic bobsledders of Japan
Bobsledders at the 1972 Winter Olympics
Bobsledders at the 1976 Winter Olympics
Bobsledders at the 1980 Winter Olympics
Bobsledders at the 1984 Winter Olympics
Sportspeople from Swansea